The Augusta metropolitan area is a metropolitan area in the U.S. states of Georgia and South Carolina centered on Augusta, Georgia.

Augusta metropolitan area may also refer to:
The Augusta, Maine micropolitan area, United States

See also
Augusta (disambiguation)